Vhils (born 1987) is the tag name of Portuguese graffiti and street artist Alexandre Manuel Dias Farto.

Life

Alexandre Farto was born in Portugal in 1987.  He studied at the Byam Shaw School of Art in London. Vhils lives and works in London and Lisbon. He gained prominence when his work of a face carved into a wall appeared alongside a picture by street artist Banksy at the Cans Festival in London in 2008. A photograph of him creating the work appeared on the front page of The Times.

He was later given space to show his work by Banksy's agent, Steve Lazarides. Several of his works were published in 2008. He is also shown by Vera Cortes and the Magda Danysz Gallery.

During Fremantle's 2013 Fremantle Street Arts Festival, the Norfolk Hotel was decorated with an original image of the first Australian female senator. The image of Dame Dorothy Tangney DBE was created by Vhils and his assistants.

Luxembourg Freeport, an art storage facility opened in 2014, includes a large mural by Vhils, etched into one of the atrium concrete walls.

Vhils has taken to several places of the world, trying to reveal the stories inside the walls.

Main Work

Gallery

Solo shows
2021, Latency - Danysz Gallery, Shanghai
2021, Trace - Fluctuart, Paris 
2021, Portal - MAGMA Gallery, Bologna
2021, Fenestra - Galeria Vera Cortês, Lisbon 
2020, Haze - Contemporary Arts Center, Cincinnati 
2020, Momentum - Danysz gallery, Paris 
2019, Realm - Galerie Danysz, Shanghai 
2019, Panorama - Arsham/Fieg Gallery, New York
2019, Incisão - CAIXA Cultural Brasília, Brasilia
2018, Fragments Urbains - Le Centquatre, Paris
2017, Vhils X CAFA Museum - Pékin, Beijing
2015, Dissonance, Lazarides, London
2014, Vestiges, Magda Danysz Gallery, Paris
2012, Entropy, Magda Danysz Gallery, Paris
2012, Vera Cortes, Lisbon
2012, Visceral, Magda Danysz Gallery, Shanghai
2009, Scratching the surface, Lazarides, London
2008, Even if you win the rat race

Honours

National Honours 

  Knight of the Order of Saint James of the Sword (9 June 2015)

Sources
https://www.lazinc.com/usr/documents/exhibitions/press_release_url/610/alexandre-farto-aka-vhils-dissonance-press.pdf
https://web.archive.org/web/20090315052045/http://lazinc.com/artists/vhils/
http://www.art2bank.com/london_art_news/featured-galleries/vhils-in-under-a-red-sky-at-st.php
https://web.archive.org/web/20120523065604/http://streetartparis.org/blog/2012/05/20/vhils-aka-alexandre-farko-hits-le-m-u-r-association-modulable-urbain-reactif-in-oberkampf-paris/

References

External links

Vhils aka Alexandre Farto on Lazinc
Vhils selected images on Art Days
Vhils Interview on Stencil Revolution
Vhils on Magda Danysz Gallery

1987 births
Living people
Portuguese graffiti artists
Street artists